Diego Martín Caballero Manzanares (born 13 June 1991) is an Uruguayan professional footballer who plays for Gibraltarian club Mons Calpe. Mainly a left back, he can also play as a defensive midfielder.

Club career
Born in Montevideo, Caballero moved to Argentina at early age and graduated from Nueva Chicago's youth setup. He made his senior debut on 25 May 2012, starting in a 1–1 Primera B Metropolitana home draw against Sarmiento; it was his only appearance of the campaign, which ended in promotion.

On 8 October 2012 Caballero made his professional debut, coming on as a second-half substitute for Agustín Farías in a 1–1 draw at Huracán in the Primera B Nacional. He contributed with 16 appearances as his side was immediately relegated back.

Caballero featured regularly during the club's two consecutive promotions, the last one to the Primera División. He made his debut in the category on 23 March 2015, starting in a 0–1 home loss against San Lorenzo.

On 21 February 2016 Caballero moved abroad, after agreeing to a contract at Spanish Segunda División side Girona FC and being immediately assigned to the reserves in the regional leagues. For the 2016–17 season, he represented Germany's 1.FC Heiningen and Racing Club de Carhué back in his home nation.

On 26 June 2017, Caballero returned to Spain after agreeing to a contract with CF Sant Rafel of the Tercera División. He left the club on 11 September without making a single appearance, and went on to play for Italian sides A.S.D. Atletico Castenaso Van Goof and S.S. Casalecchio 1921.

On 7 July 2018, Caballero was announced at Vélez CF, but he moved to UE Tàrrega on 25 August. He renewed with the latter club on 17 July of the following year, but left the club at the start of new season due to work problems; he eventually returned to Tàrrega in January 2020.

References

External links

1993 births
Living people
Footballers from Montevideo
Uruguayan footballers
Association football defenders
Argentine Primera División players
Primera Nacional players
Nueva Chicago footballers
Tercera División players
Girona FC B players
UE Tàrrega players
CF Sant Rafel players
Mons Calpe S.C. players
Uruguayan expatriate footballers
Uruguayan expatriate sportspeople in Argentina
Uruguayan expatriate sportspeople in Spain
Uruguayan expatriate sportspeople in Germany
Uruguayan expatriate sportspeople in Italy
Expatriate footballers in Argentina
Expatriate footballers in Spain
Expatriate footballers in Germany
Expatriate footballers in Italy
Expatriate footballers in Gibraltar